The women's discus throw at the 2018 IAAF World U20 Championships was held at Ratina Stadium on 10 and 12 July.

Records

Results

Qualification
The qualification round took place on 10 July in two groups, with Group A starting at 16:45 and Group B starting at 18:09. Athletes attaining a mark of at least 53.00 metres ( Q ) or at least the 12 best performers ( q ) qualified for the final.

Final
The final was held on 12 July at 19:35.

References

discus throw
Discus throw at the World Athletics U20 Championships